Matt is an unincorporated community in Forsyth County, Georgia, United States. It is located on Georgia State Route 369, which is named Matt Highway where it passes through the community.

History
A post office was in operation at Matt from 1896 until 1911. The identity of the town's namesake is unclear; it possibly was named after Matt J. Williams, a county judge.

Education 
Liberty Middle School
Matt Elementary School

References

Unincorporated communities in Georgia (U.S. state)
Unincorporated communities in Forsyth County, Georgia